Anerastia flaveolella is a species of snout moth in the genus Anerastia. It was described by Émile Louis Ragonot in 1887. It is found in South Africa.

References

Endemic moths of South Africa
Moths described in 1887
Anerastiini
Moths of Africa